TeamBath is the University of Bath's sporting organisation. In addition to entering teams in BUCS intervarsity competitions, TeamBath has also entered teams in national leagues and competitions. Team Bath F.C. reached the first round proper of the 2002–03 FA Cup. They become the first university team to reach this stage since Oxford University A.F.C. in 1880. In 2005–06 the netball team were both founder members and the inaugural champions of the Netball Superleague. They were Superleague champions again in 2006–07, 2008–09, 2009–10 and 2013. The field hockey club enter a team in the Men's England Hockey League.

TeamBath's main sports complex is the Sports Training Village based at the University of Bath campus at Claverton Down. The university has hosted several sporting events, including the 1995 European Youth Summer Olympic Days, the 2015 and 2019 European Modern Pentathlon Championships and the 2019 Fed Cup Europe/Africa Zone competition. The facilities at the University of Bath have also been used as a training base by many individual Olympians and Paralympians.

History

Hall of Fame

Medallists
The following athletes have either been students at the University of Bath or have been based at the University's training facilities.

Summer Olympics
Athletics

Judo

Modern Pentathlon

Rowing

Swimming

Summer Paralympics 
Athletics

Sailing

Swimming

Wheelchair fencing

Winter Olympics
Skeleton

Winter Paralympics
Alpine skiing

Facilities

Sports Training Village

TeamBath's main sports complex is the Sports Training Village based at University of Bath campus at Claverton Down. Facilities include:

 Olympic-sized London 2012 legacy pool.
 Fitness gyms
 Outdoor floodlit 400m athletics track.
 Indoor sprint track.
 Three large sprung-wood sports halls.
 Indoor and outdoor tennis courts.
 Judo dojo.
 Indoor jumps and throws hall.
 Fencing pistes.
 Outdoor and indoor shooting ranges.
 Bobsleigh/skeleton push-start track
 Rugby and football pitches
 Outdoor field hockey pitches
 Physio treatment areas and sport science labs

Team Bath Arena
The 2,000-seater Team Bath Arena is home of Netball Superleague's Team Bath.

Directors of Sport

References

External links
 University of Bath
  Team Bath on Facebook
  Team Bath on Twitter

 
 
University and college sports clubs in England